Jerry 'Iron Outlaw' Pritchett (born 18 December 1980) is an American strongman competitor and a regular entrant to the World's Strongest Man competition winning 4th place in 2020 and 3rd place in Master's category in 2021. He is also America's Strongest Man in 2017 and has won All-American Strongman Challenge back to back in 2013 and 2014. Jerry has competed in 42 International strongman competitions.

Background
As a professional metal fabricator, Jerry was always interested in strength and implemented several strongman movements into his training to help with Powerlifting. In 2008 he took part in a local Strongman contest in Phoenix, Arizona and took second place, thus sparking his drive to continue and pursue Strongman. 

Jerry also has raced as a sprint car driver.

Personal Records
Deadlift -  (former joint Strongman Deadlift world record) (2016 Europe's Strongest Man) 
Elephant bar Deadlift -  (former elephant bar Deadlift world record) (2017 Arnold Strongman Classic) 
Squat -  (Raw)
Bench Press - 
Log press -  (2020 Shaw Classic)

References

 
1980 births
Living people
American strength athletes